The men's doubles badminton event at the 2022 Commonwealth Games was held from 4 to 8 August 2022 at the National Exhibition Centre on the Solihull, England. The defending gold medalists were Marcus Ellis and Chris Langridge of England. Ellis and Langridge did not defend their title.

The athletes were drawn into straight knockout stage. The draw for the competition was conducted on 28 July 2022.

Seeds

The seeds for the tournament were:

  (semi-finals, Bronze medalists)
  (champions, Gold medalists)

  (final, Silver medalists)
  (second round)

Results

Finals

Top half

Section 1

Section 2

Bottom half

Section 3

Section 4

References

Men's doubles